"Joe Cool" is the second single by Australian rock band Girl Monstar. Both songs from the single were included as bonus tracks on the band's 1992 debut album, Monstereo Delicio.

Both songs were produced, arranged and engineered by Kevin Shirley (Iron Maiden, Journey, Rush, Led Zeppelin). This was also the debut recording of Anne McCue who wrote and sung lead vocals on the B-side track "Egomaniac". The single was released on blue 7" vinyl.

The single was released in June 1990 and received heavy rotation on national broadcaster, Triple J, ultimately reaching No. 1 on Australia's independent charts. In late 1990 Girl Monstar performed the song "Joe Cool" on the nationally broadcast Countdown Revolution. It was also subsequently nominated for Best Independent Release at the 1991 ARIA Music Awards.

The release was also available as a cassette single.

Track listing

Personnel
Band members
 Sherry Valier – lead vocals ("Joe Cool"), guitar
 Anne McCue – guitar, lead vocals ("Egomaniac")
 Damian Child – bass, backing vocals
 Sue World – drums, backing vocals

Recording process
 Producer – Kevin Shirley
 Engineer – Kevin Shirley
 Assistant engineer – Peter 'Bruce' Lees, Miranda McCauley
 Mastering – Leon Zervos
 Recording Studio – Sing Sing Studios, Melbourne 
Mixing studio – Rich Studios, Sydney

References

1990 singles
1990 songs